Devenish or Devinish is an island in Lower Lough Erne, County Fermanagh, Northern Ireland. Aligned roughly north–south, it is about one and a quarter miles (2 km) long and two-thirds of a mile (1 km) wide. The main place to catch a ferry to the island is at Trory Point, just outside Enniskillen.
Devenish Island is owned by the Kilravock Christian Trust.

See also
 List of archaeological sites in County Fermanagh
 Northern Ireland Environment Agency
 List of townlands in County Fermanagh
 Cahalan Ó Corcrán
 The Round O

References

Sources

Further reading

External links

 Virtual tour of Devenish Island Monastic Site – Virtual Visit Northern Ireland

Islands of County Fermanagh
Archaeological sites in County Fermanagh
Townlands of County Fermanagh
Uninhabited islands of Northern Ireland
Scheduled monuments in Northern Ireland
Towers in Northern Ireland
Ruins in Northern Ireland
Northern Ireland Environment Agency properties
Culdees
Lake islands of Northern Ireland